4 is the fourth studio album by Japanese hip-hop group Lead. The album was released as their fourth album on their four-year anniversary. It ranked lower on the Oricon charts than their previous album, coming in at number 18 and only remaining on the charts for two weeks.

Each album came with one of four possible 3D trading cards.

Information
4 is the fourth studio album by four-member Japanese hip-hop group Lead. It was released on their fourth anniversary as artists, which was where the album's title derived. The album was one of their lower ranking albums on the Oricon Albums Charts, peaking at No. 18 and remaining on the charts for two consecutive weeks. The album consisted of two preceding singles: Virgin Blue and Summer Madness.

For the album, the group delved into the reggae genre, along with their traditional hip-hop and R&B beats. The album contained eight new tracks, along with alternate versions of their songs "Summer Madness" and "One" from their Summer Madness single. As with their previous albums, a CD+DVD combination was not included, the album carrying only a CD version. Music videos for their songs "Summer Madness" and "Virgin Blue" were later released on their compilation DVD Movies 3 in August 2008.

The song "Virgin Blue" was a cover of the same song, originally performed by six-member Japanese rock band SALLY in 1984. Lead's version was given an updated tempo, allowing the song to be more of dance anthem. The lyrics to song were written by Sagara Yoshiaki with the modern arrangement performed by Suzuki Kisaburo.

Promotional activities
To help in promotion, the group performed several songs live and the song "Summer Madness" was used as the ending theme to the television series We Have Muscle! (いただきマッスル! / Itadaki MASSURU) during the month of July.

March 10, 2006 on the popular Japanese show Music Fighter, Lead performed "Virgin Blue". On June 23, they performed "Summer Madness". The group held their corresponding album tour Lead Upturn 2006 [4] throughout the summer and fall months. It was released later on DVD in December.

Track listing

Charts

References

External links
 Lead Official Site

2006 albums
Pony Canyon albums
Lead (band) albums